Kentallen was a railway station at the head of Kentallen Bay, which is on the southern shore of Loch Linnhe in the Highland council area of Scotland. It was on the Ballachulish branch line that linked Connel Ferry, on the main line of the Callander and Oban Railway, with Ballachulish.

History 
This station opened on 20 August 1903. It was laid out with two platforms, one on either side of a crossing loop. There were sidings on the east side of the line.

The station was temporarily closed from 25 May to 24 August 1953 when flooding washed away a bridge. It was then closed by the British Railways Board in 1966, when the Ballachulish Branch of the Callander and Oban Railway was closed.

The station had been the location of a LMS caravan in 1935 and then two caravans from 1936 to 1939. A camping coach was also positioned here by the Scottish Region from 1953 to 1965.

Following closure the station buildings were converted into a hotel and restaurant.

Signalling 
Throughout its existence, the Ballachulish Branch was worked by the electric token system. Kentallen signal box was located on the Up platform, on the east side of the railway. It had 24 levers.

References

Notes

Sources

Further reading

External links 
 Kentallen station on navigable 1954 map
Ballachulish Branch (Callander and Oban Railway)

Lochaber
Railway stations in Great Britain opened in 1903
Railway stations in Great Britain closed in 1953
Railway stations in Great Britain opened in 1953
Railway stations in Great Britain closed in 1966
Disused railway stations in Highland (council area)
Beeching closures in Scotland
Former Caledonian Railway stations
James Miller railway stations
1903 establishments in Scotland
1966 disestablishments in Scotland